The 2003 FIBA Africa Championship was the 22nd FIBA Africa Championship, played under the rules of FIBA, the world governing body for basketball, and the FIBA Africa thereof. The tournament was hosted by Egypt from August 7 to 16 2003.

Angola defeated Nigeria 85–65 in the final to win their seventh title. and securing a spot at the 2004 Summer Olympics.

Squads

Draw

Preliminary round 
Times given below are in UTC+2.

Group A

Group B

Knockout stage

11th place match

9th place match

7th place match

5th place match

Semifinals bracket

Bronze medal match

Final

Final standings

Awards

All-Tournament Team

See also
 2002 FIBA Africa Clubs Champions Cup

References

External links
Official Website

 
AfroBasket
2003 in Egyptian sport
2003 in African basketball
International basketball competitions hosted by Egypt
August 2003 sports events in Africa